Alexander Jesús Medina Reobasco (born 8 August 1978) is a Uruguayan football manager and former player who played as a striker. 

Medina is often nicknamed Cacique (Chief) due to his command inside the field.

Playing career

Club
Born in Salto, Medina began his career with local side Ferrocarril de Salto. After representing Fritsa de Tacuarembó, he made his professional debuts with Huracán Buceo in 1998.

Medina subsequently represented Central Español and Liverpool Montevideo, finishing the 2003 season as the top scorer. He moved to Nacional for the 2004 season, and was again the league's top scorer with 26 goals.

In August 2005, Medina moved abroad and joined La Liga side Cádiz CF. He featured sparingly in his first season, as his side suffered relegation, and appeared more regularly in his second, as the club narrowly missed out promotion.

On 31 August 2007, Medina signed for Racing de Ferrol also in the Spanish second tier. A first-choice, he only scored three goals as the Galicians suffered relegation.

Medina returned to his home country and Nacional in June 2008, but left the club in August of the following year to sign for Arsenal de Sarandí. He switched teams and countries again in January 2010, after agreeing to a deal with Unión Española, but returned to his home country for the 2011 with River Plate Montevideo.

In 2011, Medina returned to Nacional for a third spell. Initially a starter, he fell down the pecking order during the 2013 season, and moved to Fenix in August 2014. He retired in the following year, aged 37.

International
Medina made his full international debut for Uruguay on 1 March 2006, coming on as a late substitute for Diego Forlán in a 1–2 friendly match against England.

Managerial career

Nacional
In July 2016, Medina returned to his former club Nacional, as a manager of the youth setup. On 12 December of the following year, he was named manager of the first team in the place of Martín Lasarte.

Medina led Nacional to the Championship play-off in his first season, but lost to eventual champions Peñarol. On 7 December 2018, he resigned.

Talleres
On 6 June 2019, Medina replaced departing Juan Pablo Vojvoda at the helm of Talleres de Córdoba in the Argentine top tier. In his first season, he qualified the club to the Copa Sudamericana, and led the side to an impressive third place finish in the 2021 campaign; he also reached the Final of the 2019–20 Copa Argentina, but lost on penalties to Boca Juniors.

On 23 December 2021, Medina left Talleres as his contract was due to expire.

Internacional
On 27 December 2021, Medina was appointed manager of Campeonato Brasileiro Série A side Internacional on a one-year contract. He was sacked the following 15 April, after a 1–1 draw with Paraguayan side Guaireña.

Vélez Sarsfield
On 24 May 2022, Medina agreed to become the manager of Vélez Sarsfield, returning to Argentina after nearly six months. He left the club on a mutual agreement the following 26 February.

Managerial statistics

Honours

Player
Nacional
Uruguayan Primera División: 2005, 2008–09, 2011–12

References

External links

1978 births
Living people
Uruguayan footballers
Footballers from Salto, Uruguay
Cádiz CF players
Central Español players
Club Nacional de Football players
Association football forwards
Uruguayan Primera División players
La Liga players
Racing de Ferrol footballers
Liverpool F.C. (Montevideo) players
Club Atlético River Plate (Montevideo) players
Arsenal de Sarandí footballers
Unión Española footballers
Argentine Primera División players
Uruguayan expatriate footballers
Expatriate footballers in Spain
Expatriate footballers in Argentina
Expatriate footballers in Chile
Uruguayan expatriate sportspeople in Spain
Uruguayan expatriate sportspeople in Argentina
Uruguayan expatriate sportspeople in Chile
Expatriate football managers in Argentina
Expatriate football managers in Brazil
Uruguayan expatriate sportspeople in Brazil
Uruguayan football managers
Club Nacional de Football managers
Uruguay international footballers
Talleres de Córdoba managers
Sport Club Internacional managers
Argentine Primera División managers
Club Atlético Vélez Sarsfield managers
Uruguayan expatriate football managers